Finchfield is a suburb of Wolverhampton, West Midlands, England.  It is located south-west of the city centre, within the Tettenhall Wightwick Ward between the Merry Hill and Tettenhall Regis Wards of Wolverhampton City Council. Many of the streets have arboreal/plant related names.

History
Until 1974, Finchfield was a district of South Staffordshire. Finchfield was nothing more than a small village until the 20th Century, when parcels of agricultural land and the gardens and grounds of gentlemen were sold off for housing.

Churches
Windmill Community Church is a non-denominational Christian church.

Library
Finchfield library was one of nine Wolverhampton libraries that Wolverhampton City Council planned to close or merge, under plans to create 'community hubs' in the city. A consultation was launched after an outcry by the public over the plans, and several 'Save Our Library' campaigns were started. It was proposed that Finchfield library would be closed and moved to Bradmore Community Centre, or extended to include community services. On 28 November 2012, the council announced that Finchfield library along with a few others, would remain open where they are.

Facilities
Westacre Infant school and Uplands Junior school are situated in this area. There are also two public houses, "The Chestnut Tree" and "Westacres".
In the centre of Finchfield is a Lidl supermarket, which has been the subject of a public inquiry after it appealed refusal of planning permission when applying to extend the store. The planned extension would result in the demolition of a Victorian era property, which residents and the City Council have appealed against, though the Planning Inspectorate have now granted permission for the extension to go ahead.

Crime and local reaction
There have been several recent criminal incidents around the shopping parade at Finchfield Road West, notably an armed robbery at the Co-Op store in September 2012. In response, residents, with the backing of West Midlands Police, have set up a 'Shop Watch' for recording incidents of anti-social behaviour, graffiti and fly tipping.

References

Areas of Wolverhampton